Oenopia may refer to:

 Oenopia, ancient name of the Greek island of Aegina
 Oenopia (beetle), a genus of ladybird beetles in the family Coccinellidae